The Nevada National Security Site (N2S2 or NNSS), known as the Nevada Test Site (NTS) until 2010, is a United States Department of Energy (DOE) reservation located in southeastern Nye County, Nevada, about 65 miles (105 km) northwest of the city of Las Vegas. Formerly known as the Nevada Proving Grounds, the site was established in 1951 for the testing of nuclear devices. It covers approximately 1,360 square miles (3,500 km2) of desert and mountainous terrain. Nuclear weapons testing at the site began with a 1-kiloton-of-TNT (4.2 TJ) bomb dropped on Frenchman Flat on January 27, 1951. Over the subsequent four decades, over 1,000 nuclear explosions were detonated at the site. Many of the iconic images of the nuclear era come from the site.

The city of Las Vegas experienced noticeable seismic effects, and the mushroom clouds, which could be seen from the downtown hotels, became tourist attractions. Westerly winds routinely carried the fallout from above-ground nuclear testing directly through St. George, Utah and southern Utah. Increases in cancers, such as leukemia, lymphoma, thyroid cancer, breast cancer, melanoma, bone cancer, brain tumors, and gastrointestinal tract cancers, were reported from the mid-1950s onward. A further 828 nuclear tests were carried out underground.

From 1986 through 1994, two years after the United States put a hold on full-scale nuclear weapons testing, 536 anti-nuclear protests were held at the site, involving 37,488 participants and 15,740 arrests, according to government records.

The site contains 28 areas, 1,100 buildings, 400 miles (640 km) of paved roads, 300 miles of unpaved roads, 10 heliports, and two airstrips.

Currently, Mission Support and Test Services (MSTS) is the civilian contractor for the site's management and oversees overall operations. MSTS manages and operates the site for the National Nuclear Security Administration (NNSA). Security is provided by SOC LLC. MSTS is a joint venture of Honeywell International Inc., Jacobs Engineering Group Inc., and HII Nuclear, Inc.

History

The site was established as a  area by President Harry S. Truman on December 18, 1950, within the Nellis Air Force Gunnery and Bombing Range.

1951–1992

The site was the primary testing location of American nuclear devices from 1951 to 1992; 928 announced nuclear tests occurred there. Of those, 828 were underground. (Sixty-two of the underground tests included multiple, simultaneous nuclear detonations, adding 93 detonations and bringing the total number of NTS nuclear detonations to 1,021, of which 921 were underground.) The site contains many subsidence craters from the testing.

Many of these occurred at the Pacific Proving Grounds in the Marshall Islands.

During the 1950s, the mushroom clouds from atmospheric tests could be seen for almost . The city of Las Vegas experienced noticeable seismic effects, and the distant mushroom clouds, which could be seen from the downtown hotels, became tourist attractions. The last atmospheric test detonation at the site was "Little Feller I" of Operation Sunbeam, on July 17, 1962.

Although the United States did not ratify the Comprehensive Nuclear-Test-Ban Treaty, it honors the articles of the treaty, and underground testing of weapons ended as of September 23, 1992. Subcritical tests not involving a critical mass continued.

One notable test shot was the "Sedan" shot of Operation Storax on July 6, 1962, a  shot for Operation Plowshare, which sought to prove that nuclear weapons could be used for peaceful means in creating bays or canals. It created a crater 1,280 feet (390 m) wide and 320 feet (100 m) deep.

1992–present
More than 27 subcritical tests have been conducted at the site

In 2018, the State of Nevada sued the federal government to block a plan to ship "more than a metric ton" of plutonium to the site for temporary storage.

In 2022, the government acknowledged that 13,625 cubic meters of radioactive material conforming to its disposal criteria had been shipped to the site for disposal.

Destruction and survivability testing
  Testing of the various effects of detonation of nuclear weapons was carried out during above-ground tests. Many kinds of vehicles (ranging from cars to aircraft), nuclear-fallout and standard bomb-shelters, public-utility stations and other building structures and equipment were placed at measured distances away from "ground zero", the spot on the surface immediately under or over the center of the blast. Operation Cue tested civil defense measures.  Such civilian and commercial effects testing was done with many of the atomic tests of Operation Greenhouse on Eniwetok Atoll, Operation Upshot-Knothole and Operation Teapot at the site.

Homes and commercial buildings of many different types and styles were built to standards typical of American and (less-often) European cities. Other such structures included military fortifications (of types used by both NATO and the Soviet-led Warsaw Pact) and civil-defense as well as "backyard"-type shelters. In such a typical test, several of the same buildings and structures might be built using the same layouts and plans with different types of materials, paints, general landscaping, cleanliness of the surrounding yards, wall-angles or varying distances from ground zero. Mannequins were placed in and around the test vehicles and buildings, aside from some left out in the open, for testing clothing and shock effects.

High-speed cameras were placed in protected locations to capture effects of radiation and shock waves. Typical imagery from these cameras shows paint boiling off the buildings, which are then pushed violently away from ground zero by the shock wave before being drawn toward the detonation by the suction caused by the climbing mushroom cloud. Footage from these cameras has become iconic, used in various media and available in the public domain.

This testing allowed the development of Civil Defense guidelines, distributed to the public, to increase the likelihood of survival in case of air- or spaceborne nuclear attack.

Environmental impact
Each of the below-ground explosions—some as deep as 5,000 feet (1.5 km)—vaporized a large chamber, leaving a cavity filled with radioactive rubble. About a third of the tests were conducted directly in aquifers, and others were hundreds or thousands of feet below the water table.

In the most seriously affected zones, the concentration of radioactivity in groundwater reaches millions of picocuries per liter. (The federal standard for drinking water is 20 picocuries per liter (0.74 Bq/L).) Although radioactivity levels in the water continue to decline over time, the longer-lived isotopes like plutonium or uranium could pose risks for thousands of years.

The Department of Energy has more than 48 monitoring wells at the site. Because the contaminated water poses no immediate health threat, the department ranked the site as low priority for clean-up. In 2009, tritium with a half-life of 12.3 years was first detected in groundwater off-site in Pahute Mesa, near the locations of the 1968 Benham and 1975 Tybo tests.

The DOE issues an annual environmental monitoring report containing data from the monitoring wells both on and off site.

Janice C. Beatley started to study the botany of the Nevada test site in 1962 when she created 68 study sites. The intention had been to study the effect of radiation on the plants but this plan had to be changed when the United States abandoned atmospheric testing in 1963. The sites however became important because they recorded long term change through 1980. Much of her data was never published; however it was all transferred to the United States Geological Survey after her death. It was "an ideal place to conduct long-term ecosystem research."

Protests and demonstrations

From 1986 through 1994, two years after the United States ended nuclear weapons testing, 536 demonstrations were held at the site involving 37,488 participants and 15,740 arrests, according to government records.

On February 5, 1987, more than 400 people were arrested trying to enter the site after nearly 2,000 demonstrators held a rally to protest nuclear weapons testing. Those arrested included the astronomer Carl Sagan and the actors Kris Kristofferson, Martin Sheen, and Robert Blake. Five Democratic members of Congress attended the rally: Thomas J. Downey, Mike Lowry, Jim Bates, Leon E. Panetta, and Barbara Boxer.

American Peace Test (APT) and Nevada Desert Experience (NDE) held most of these. In March 1988, APT held an event where more than 8,000 people attended a ten-day action to "Reclaim the Test Site", where nearly 3,000 people were arrested, including more than 1,200 in one day. This set a record for most civil disobedience arrests in a single protest.

On October 12,1992, coinciding with the 500 year anniversary of the arrival of Columbus and the beginning of the genocide of indigenous people by Europeans in the Americas, an 11 day protest took place at the Test Site. At the invitation of the Western Shoshone Tribe and Corbin Harney, an anti-nuclear activist and spiritual leader for the Newe people, over 2000 protestors from 12 different countries gathered for "Healing Global Wounds". In their media work, protestors and organizers demanded an end to nuclear weapons testing and return of the test site to the Western Shoshone people. Camped in the desert, participants took part in anti-racism and peaceful civil disobedience trainings. They planed actions and demonstrations, eventually using culverts and other means to enter the Test Site where 530 were arrested by Wackenhut Security forces on charges of trespassing. Full scale nuclear weapons testing did not resume.
 
After 1994, Shundahai Network in cooperation with Nevada Desert Experience and Corbin Harney continued the protests of the work at the site and staged efforts to stop a repository for highly radioactive waste adjacent to the test site at nearby Yucca Mountain.

Modern usage

The site continues to be used for nuclear weapons research and development. This includes subcritical testing. These tests are conducted jointly by Los Alamos National Laboratory, Lawrence Livermore National Laboratory, and the British Atomic Weapons Establishment. A recent one was Ediza (2019), and Nightshade A (2020).

The site offers monthly public tours, often booked months in advance. Visitors are not allowed to bring cameras, binoculars, or cell phones, nor are they permitted to pick up rocks for souvenirs.

While there are no longer any explosive tests of nuclear weapons at the site, there is still testing done to determine the viability of the United States' aging nuclear arsenal. Additionally, the site is the location of the Area 5 Radioactive Waste Management Complex, which sorts and stores low-level radioactive waste that is not transuranic and has a half life of less than 20 years.

The Radiological/Nuclear WMD Incident Exercise Site (T-1) replicates multiple terrorist radiological incidents with train, plane, automobile, truck, and helicopter props. It is located in Area 1, at the former site of tests EASY, SIMON, APPLE-2, and GALILEO.

Landmarks and geography

A table of interesting places in and around the NNSS is presented here, which corresponds with many of the descriptions in the Nevada Test Site Guide.

Cancer and test site

St. George, Utah received fallout from above-ground nuclear testing in the Yucca Flats at the site. Winds routinely carried the fallout of these tests directly through St. George and southern Utah.  Marked increases in cancers such as leukemia, lymphoma, thyroid cancer, breast cancer, melanoma, bone cancer, brain tumors, and gastrointestinal tract cancers were reported from the mid-1950s through 1980.

On May 19, 1953, the 32-kiloton (130 TJ) atomic bomb (nicknamed "Harry") was detonated at the site. The bomb later gained the name "Dirty Harry" because of the amount of off-site fallout generated by the bomb.

A 1962 United States Atomic Energy Commission report found that "children living in St. George, Utah may have received doses to the thyroid of radioiodine as high as 120 to 440 rads" (1.2 to 4.4 Gy). A 1979 study reported in the New England Journal of Medicine concluded that:

A significant excess of leukemia deaths occurred in children up to 14 years of age living in Utah between 1959 and 1967. This excess was concentrated in the cohort of children born between 1951 and 1958, and was most pronounced in those residing in counties receiving high fallout.

In 1982, a lawsuit brought by nearly 1,200 people accused the government of negligence in atomic and/or nuclear weapons testing at the site, which they said had caused leukemia and other cancers. Dr. Karl Z. Morgan, Director of Health Physics at Oak Ridge National Laboratory, testified that radiation protection measures in the tests were substandard to best practices at the time.

In a report by the National Cancer Institute, released in 1997, it was determined that 90 atmospheric tests at the site deposited high levels of radioactive iodine-131 (5.5 exabecquerels) across much of the contiguous United States, especially in the years 1952, 1953, 1955, and 1957 — doses large enough, it claimed, to produce 10,000 to 75,000 cases of thyroid cancer. The Radiation Exposure Compensation Act of 1990 allowed for people living downwind of the site for at least two years in particular Nevada, Arizona, or Utah counties, between January 21, 1951, and October 31, 1958, or June 30 and July 31, 1962, and suffering from certain cancers or other serious illnesses deemed to have been caused by fallout exposure to receive compensation of $50,000. By 2014, over 28,000 downwinder claims for a total compensation of $1.9 billion had been processed. Additionally, the Energy Employees Occupational Illness Compensation Program Act of 2000 provides compensation and medical benefits for nuclear weapons workers who may have developed certain work-related illnesses.

Uranium miners, mill workers, and ore transporters are also eligible for $100,000 compassionate payment under the Radiation Exposure Compensation Program, while $75,000 is the fixed payment amount for workers who were participants in the above-ground nuclear weapons tests.

Nuclear test series carried out at the site

 Operation Ranger — 1951
 Operation Buster–Jangle — 1951
 Operation Tumbler–Snapper — 1952
 Operation Upshot–Knothole — 1953
 Operation Teapot — 1955
 Project 56 — 1955
 Operation Plumbbob — 1957
 Project 57, Project 58/58A — 1957–1958
 Operation Hardtack II — 1958
 Operation Nougat — 1961–1962
 Operation Plowshare — 1961–1973 (sporadic, at least one test a year)
 Operation Sunbeam (aka Dominic II) — 1962
 Operation Dominic — 1962–1963
 Operation Storax — 1963
 Operation Niblick — 1963–1964
 Operation Whetstone — 1964–1965
 Operation Flintlock — 1965–1966
 Operation Latchkey — 1966–1967
 Operation Crosstie — 1967–1968
 Operation Bowline — 1968–1969
 Operation Mandrel — 1969–1970

 Operation Emery — 1970
 Operation Grommet — 1971–1972
 Operation Toggle — 1972–1973
 Operation Arbor — 1973–1974
 Operation Bedrock — 1974–1975
 Operation Anvil — 1975–1976
 Operation Fulcrum — 1976–1977
 Operation Cresset — 1977–1978
 Operation Quicksilver — 1978–1979
 Operation Tinderbox — 1979–1980
 Operation Guardian — 1980–1981
 Operation Praetorian — 1981–1982
 Operation Phalanx — 1982–1983
 Operation Fusileer — 1983–1984
 Operation Grenadier — 1984–1985
 Operation Charioteer — 1985–1986
 Operation Musketeer — 1986–1987
 Operation Touchstone — 1987–1988
 Operation Cornerstone — 1988–1989
 Operation Aqueduct — 1989–1990
 Operation Sculpin — 1990–1991
 Operation Julin — 1991–1992

Areas 

The site is broken down into areas.  Some of the areas and their uses include the following:

Area 1

Area 1 held eight nuclear tests for a total of nine detonations.
Four early atmospheric tests were conducted above Area 1 in the early 1950s, as well as three underground tests in 1971 and 1990. In 1955, a Civil Defense experiment (called Operation Cue in the press) studied nuclear blast effects on various building types; a few structures still stand.

Heavy drilling equipment and concrete construction facilities are sited in Area 1. Non-destructive X-ray, gamma ray, and subcritical detonation tests continue to be conducted in Area 1.

The radioactivity present on the ground in Area 1 provides a radiologically contaminated environment for the training of first responders.

Area 2

Area 2 was the site of 144 tests comprising 169 detonations. A test named "Gabbs" was intended for early 1993 but was cancelled in 1992 due to a pre-emptive halt to testing based on the Comprehensive Nuclear-Test-Ban Treaty.

Area 3
Area 3 held 266 nuclear tests for a total of 288 detonations, including Upshot-Knothole 'Harry',  more than in any other area of the site.

As part of Operation Tinderbox, on June 24, 1980, a large satellite prototype (DSCS III) was subjected to radioactivity from the "Huron King" shot in a vertical line-of-sight (VLOS) test undertaken in Area 3. This was a program to improve the database on nuclear hardening design techniques for defense satellites.

The final nuclear test detonation at site was Operation Julin's "Divider" on September 23, 1992, just prior to the moratorium ending all nuclear testing. Divider was a safety experiment test shot that was detonated at the bottom of a shaft sunk into Area 3.

In 1995 and 1997, plutonium-contaminated soil from "Double Tracks" and "Clean Slate 1" of Operation Roller Coaster (1963) was picked up from the Tonopah Test Range and brought to the Area 3 Radioactive Waste Management Site as a first step in eventually returning Tonopah Test Range to an environmentally neutral state. Corrective action regarding the contaminated material from the "Clean Slate 2" and "Clean Slate 3" tests has yet to be agreed upon.

Area 4

Area 4 held 40 nuclear tests for a total of 44 detonations.

It is home to the Big Explosives Experimental Facility (BEEF).

Area 5

Area 5 held 19 nuclear tests.
Five atmospheric tests were detonated, starting on January 27, 1951, at Area 5 as part of Operation Ranger. These were the first nuclear tests at the site. Further tower detonations were studied at Area 5, and the Grable shot which was fired from a M65 Atomic Cannon located in Area 11 exploded in Area 5. The Priscilla test was conducted at Area 5 on June 24, 1957.

Five underground tests were set up at Area 5; four of those included accidental release of radioactive materials. On March 16, 1968, physicist Glenn T. Seaborg toured the upcoming Milk Shake shot of Operation Crosstie.
Milk Shakes radioactive release was not detected outside of the site's boundaries.

Area 6

Area 6 held four nuclear tests for a total of six detonations. The area features an asphalt runway, that was constructed on top of a dirt landing strip, that had existed since the 1950s. Some buildings, including a hangar, are situated near the runway.

The Device Assembly Facility (DAF) was originally built to consolidate nuclear explosives assembly operations. It now serves as the Criticality Experiments Facility (CEF).

The Control Point is the communication hub of the site. It was used by controllers to trigger and monitor nuclear test explosions.

In 1982, while a live nuclear bomb was being lowered underground, the base came under attack by armed combatants. The combatants turned out to be a security team conducting an improperly scheduled drill.

Area 7
Area 7 held 92 nuclear tests.

During Operation Buster, four successful tests were conducted via airdrop, with bomber aircraft releasing nuclear weapons over Area 7.

It is also the site of Matthew Reilly's book called Area 7.

Shot "Icecap" planned for 1993 was abandoned in Area 7 following 1992's testing moratorium. The tower, shaft and wiring remain in place, along with a crane intended to lower the nuclear test package into the shaft.

Area 8

Area 8 held 13 nuclear tests for a total of 15 detonations.

Area 8 hosted the "Baneberry" shot of Operation Emery on December 18, 1970. A plume of fire and dust was released, raining fallout on workers in different locations within the site. The radioactive plume released  of radioactive material, including  of Iodine131.

Area 9
Area 9 held 115 nuclear tests for a total of 133 detonations.

In Area 9, the  "Hood" test on July 5, 1957, part of Operation Plumbbob, was the largest atmospheric test ever conducted within the continental United States; nearly five times larger in yield than the bomb dropped on Hiroshima. A balloon carried Hood up to 460 meters above the ground where it was detonated. Over 2,000 troops took part in the test in order to train them in conducting operations on the nuclear battlefield.  of iodine-131 (131I) were released into the air.

Area 10

Area 10 held 57 nuclear tests for a total of 71 detonations.

The first underground test at the site was the "Uncle" shot of Operation Jangle. Uncle detonated on November 29, 1951, within a shaft sunk into Area 10.

The "John" shot of Plumbbob, on July 19, 1957, was the first test firing of the nuclear-tipped AIR-2 Genie air-to-air rocket designed to destroy incoming enemy bombers with a nuclear explosion. The  warhead exploded approximately three miles above five volunteers and a photographer who stood unprotected at "ground zero" in Area 10 to show the safety of battlefield nuclear weapons to personnel on the ground. The test also demonstrated the ability of a fighter aircraft to deliver a nuclear-tipped rocket and avoid being destroyed in the process. A Northrop F-89J fired the rocket.

The "Sedan" test of Operation Storax on July 6, 1962, a  shot for the Operation Plowshare which sought to discover whether nuclear weapons could be used for peaceful means in creating lakes, bays or canals. The explosion displaced 12 million tons of earth, creating the Sedan crater which is 1,280 feet (390 m) wide and 320 feet (100 m) deep.

Area 11

Area 11 held 9 nuclear tests.
Four of the tests were weapons safety experiments conducted as Project 56; they spread so much radioactive material  that Area 11 has been called "Plutonium Valley". As is the case with Area 1, background radiation levels make Area 11 suitable for realistic training in methods of radiation detection.

Area 12

Area 12 held 61 nuclear tests between 1957 and 1992, one of which involved two detonations. All tests were conducted below Rainier and Aqueduct mesas.

Area 12 was the primary location for tunnel tests and used almost exclusively for that purpose. The tunnel complexes mined into Rainier and Aqueduct Mesa include the B-, C-, D-, E-, F-, G-, I-, J-, K-, N-, P-, and T-Tunnel complexes, and the R- and S- shafts.

Area 13
There is no Area 13 within NNSS, though such a name is attached to a section of Nellis Air Force Range which abuts the northeastern corner of Area 15. Project 57's weapons safety test was conducted here on April 24, 1957, spreading particles emitting alpha radiation over a large area.

Area 14
Various outdoor experiments are conducted in this area. No atmospheric or underground nuclear tests were conducted in Area 14.

Area 15

Three underground detonations took place in area 15 in the 1960s.

Pile Driver was a notable Department of Defense test. A large underground installation was built to study the survivability of hardened underground bunkers undergoing a nuclear attack. Information from the test was used in designing hardened missile silos and the North American Aerospace Defense Command facility in Colorado Springs.

The abandoned Crystal and Climax mines are found in Area 15. Storage tanks hold contaminated materials.

From 1964 to 1981, the Environmental Protection Agency operated a  experimental farm in Area 15. Extensive plant and soil studies evaluated the uptake of pollutants in farm-grown vegetables and from the forage eaten by a dairy herd of some 30 Holstein cows. Scientists also studied horses, pigs, goats, and chickens.

Area 16
Area 16 held six nuclear tests.

Area 17
No nuclear tests took place in Area 17.

Area 18
Area 18 held five nuclear tests and includes the Pahute Mesa Airstrip.

Area 19

Pahute Mesa is one of four major nuclear test regions within the Nevada National Security Site (NNSS). It occupies  in the northwest corner of the NNSS. The eastern section is known as Area 19 and the western section as Area 20.

A total of 85 nuclear tests were conducted in Pahute Mesa between 1965 and 1992. Three of them — Boxcar, Benham and Handley — had a yield of over one megaton. Three tests were conducted as part of Operation Plowshare and one as part of Vela Uniform.

Area 20

The western section of Pahute Mesa, with a portion of the 85 nuclear tests conducted in the Pahute Mesa occurring in this section.

Area 21
There is no Area 21 within NNSS, though such a name is attached to a section of Los Alamos National Laboratory.

Area 22
No nuclear tests took place in Area 22. Area 22 once held Camp Desert Rock, a staging base for troops undergoing atmospheric nuclear blast training; as many as 9,000 troops camped there in 1955. Desert Rock Airport's runway was enlarged to a  length in 1969 by the Atomic Energy Commission. It is a transport hub for personnel and supplies going to NNSS and also serves as an emergency landing strip.

Area 23
No nuclear tests took place in Area 23. The town of Mercury, Nevada lies within Area 23. The area is the main pathway to and from NNSS test locations by way of U.S. Route 95. An open sanitary landfill is located to the west of Mercury, and a closed hazardous waste site abuts the landfill. Mercury is also the main management area for the site which includes a bar and large cafeteria, printing plant, medical center, warehousing, fleet management, liquidation and recycling center, engineering offices, dormitories, and other administrative areas for both the O&M contractors, LLNL, LANL, and SNL personnel. At its height in the 1950s and '60s, it also held several restaurants, a bowling alley, a movie theater, and a motel.

Area 24
There is no Area 24 within NNSS, though such a name is attached to a satellite site of the NNSS referred to as the North Las Vegas Facility.

Area 25

Area 26

No nuclear tests took place in Area 26, the most arid section of the NNSS. An old abandoned mine, the Horn Silver Mine, was used for waste disposal between 1959 and the 1970s; some of the waste is radioactive. Water flow past the shaft could pose a human health risk, so corrective action has been planned.

In 1983 the Department of Defense, the Department of Energy, and the Federal Emergency Management Agency performed the NUWAX-83 tests near Port Gaston in Area 26, simulating the explosion of a nuclear-armed helicopter and the resulting spread of nuclear debris over 65 acres. The radioactive material used to simulate the accident became inert in less than six months.

An eight-square-mile complex was constructed in Area 26 in support of Project Pluto. It consisted of six miles of roads, the critical assembly building, the control building, the assembly and shop buildings, and utilities.  Those buildings have been used recently as mock reactor facilities in the training of first responders.

Area 27

Area 28
Area 28 no longer exists; it was absorbed into Areas 25 and 27.

Area 29
No nuclear tests took place in Area 29. The rugged terrain of Area 29 serves as a buffer between other areas of NNSS. A helipad is present at Shoshone Peak.

Area 30

Area 30 has rugged terrain and includes the northern reaches of Fortymile Canyon. It is used primarily for military training and exercises.

Area 30 was the site of a single nuclear test, the Crosstie Buggy row charge experiment, part of Operation Plowshare, which involved five simultaneous detonations.

See also

 Lists of nuclear disasters and radioactive incidents
Savannah River Site– the DoE reservation with similar operations as NTS
 Semipalatinsk Test Site
 Novaya Zemlya Test Site
 Area 51/Area 52
 Totskoye nuclear exercise
 International Day against Nuclear Tests

References

External links

 DOE Nevada Test Site
 The Nevada Test Site Oral History Project
 Origins of the Nevada Test Site
 Radiation Exposure Compensation Act 
 Atomic Test Effects In The Nevada Test Site Region published by the AEC in 1955, a document with a civilian audience in mind.
 Account of NTS fallout in 1955 (PDF)
 Study Estimating Thyroid Doses of I-131 Received by Americans From Nevada Atmospheric Nuclear Bomb Test, National Cancer Institute (1997)
 Images of the Nevada Test Site on the atomic bomb website
 Location maps:
 Small map
 Detailed map showing the individual areas (archived 2007-08-12 at archive.org)
 Annotated bibliography for the Nevada Test Site from the Alsos Digital Library for Nuclear Issues
 'Exposed' spreads anti-nuke message
 Nevada Test Site aerial photos by Doc Searles, all licensed Creative Commons

 
 
 
 
 
 
 
 
 
 
 
 
 

 
 
 
 
 
 
 
 
 
 
 
 
 
 
 
 
 
 
 
 
 
 
 

 
American nuclear test sites
Nevada historical markers
Geography of Nye County, Nevada
Tourist attractions in Nye County, Nevada
Continuity of government in the United States
Historic American Engineering Record in Nevada
Environmental disasters in the United States
British nuclear test sites
Atomic tourism
1951 establishments in Nevada